Parliamentary elections were held in Norway on 10 and 11 September 1989. The Labour Party remained the largest party in the Storting, winning 63 of the 165 seats.

The non-socialist parties gained a majority, and Jan P. Syse became prime minister of a coalition minority cabinet consisting of the Conservative Party, the Christian Democratic Party, and the Centre Party. This cabinet was disbanded a year later after the Centre Party broke with the Conservatives over the Norwegian EU membership issue. Gro Harlem Brundtland became prime minister in 1990, forming a minority Labour government until the 1993 election four years later.

Results

Seat distribution

References

General elections in Norway
1980s elections in Norway
Norway
General
Norway